The canton of Castellane is an administrative division in southeastern France. At the French canton reorganisation which came into effect in March 2015, the canton was expanded from 7 to 32 communes. Its seat is in Castellane.

Composition 

It consists of the following communes:

Allons
Allos
Angles
Annot
Beauvezer
Braux
Castellane
Castellet-lès-Sausses
Colmars
Demandolx
Entrevaux
Le Fugeret
La Garde
Lambruisse
Méailles
Moriez
La Mure-Argens
Peyroules
La Rochette
Rougon
Saint-André-les-Alpes
Saint-Benoît
Saint-Julien-du-Verdon
Saint-Pierre
Sausses
Soleilhas
Thorame-Basse
Thorame-Haute
Ubraye
Val-de-Chalvagne
Vergons
Villars-Colmars

Councillors 

 Following the death of Gilbert Sauvan, his substitute, Thierry Collomp, replaces it.

Pictures of the canton

See also 
Cantons of the Alpes-de-Haute-Provence department
Communes of France

References 

Cantons of Alpes-de-Haute-Provence
Castellane